{{Infobox film
| name           = Kalay Chor
| image          =
| caption        = Original Poster
| director       = Nazar-ul-Islam
| writer         = Nasir Adeeb
| screenplay     = 
| story          = Habib Jalib
| producer       = Habib Jalib
| starring       =  Sultan RahiJaved SheikhNeeliGhulam MohiuddinIsmail ShahAfzaal AhmadQaviNaghmaBaharNida MumtazRangeelaMoin AkhterAbid AliShafqat CheemaRashid MehmoodShaguftaHumayun Qureshi
| narrator       = Saleem Ahmed Saleem
| cinematography = Waqar Bukhari
| editing        = M. Sarwar
| music          = Wajahat AttreLyricsHabib JalibSaleem Ahmed SaleemWaris LudhyanviSingersNoor Jehan, A. Nayyar, Mehnaz
| studio         = Evernew Studio| distributor    = Habib Jalib Pictures| released       = 
| runtime        = 153 minutes
| country        = Pakistan
| language       = Urdu/Punjabi, Double version
}}Kalay Chor''' is a 1991 Pakistani action film, directed by Nazar-ul-Islam and produced by Habib Jalib. The film stars actors Neeli, Sultan Rahi, Javed Sheikh, Ghulam Mohiuddin and Humayun Qureshi .

Cast
 Sultan Rahi as (Kabira)
 Javed Sheikh as (Javed)
 Neeli as (Lashi)
 Ghulam Mohiuddin as (Sher Jang)
 Humayun Qureshi as (Kaali)
 Rangeela
 Abid Ali as (Ashiq Shah)
 Afzaal Ahmed as (Sher Afghan)
 Bahar as (mother of Neeli)
 Naghma as (mother of kabira)
 Moin Akhter
 Shagufta as (Sher jang sister)
 Nida Mumtaz - (Guest)
 Rashid Mehmood
 Qavi Khan as (Press reporter)
 Akhtar Shad as (CID Officer)
 Mansoor Baloch as (Dupty Jafar)
 Mian Badal
 Mumtaz as lashi'sister
 Shafqat Cheema

Soundtrack

Track listing

Awards
Kalay Chor received a Nigar Award for the Best Actor (Javed Sheikh) category.

References

External links
 

1991 films
Pakistani political films
Pakistani action films
Punjabi-language Pakistani films
1990s Punjabi-language films
Pakistani multilingual films
1990s Urdu-language films
Political action films
Urdu-language Pakistani films
Nigar Award winners